Mirza is a major town in Kamrup Rural district of Assam, India. It is situated on south bank of river Brahmaputra and 18 kilometres from Guwahati.

Education
The literacy rate of the town is 94%. Mirza is the educational epicenter of South Kamrup region. There are two government colleges at Mirza. They are Dakshin Kamrup College and Dakshin Kamrup Girls' College. Apart from that one B.Ed. college, three private Junior colleges, eight High Schools (Government as well as Private), a private engineering institute 'NITS Mirza' is also located here.

Transport
The town is near National Highway 17, and connected to nearby towns and cities with regular buses and other modes of transportation. Mirza Railway station is located south of town, and nearest airport is Guwahati airport.

See also
 Boko
 Ramgaon

References

Cities and towns in Kamrup district